Monofunctional C1-tetrahydrofolate synthase, mitochondrial also known as formyltetrahydrofolate synthetase, is an enzyme that in humans is encoded by the MTHFD1L gene (methylenetetrahydrofolate dehydrogenase (NADP+ dependent) 1-like).

Function 

One-carbon substituted forms of tetrahydrofolate (THF) are involved in the de novo synthesis of purines and thymidylate and support cellular methylation reactions through the regeneration of methionine from homocysteine. MTHFD1L is an enzyme involved in THF synthesis in mitochondria.

In contrast to MTHFD1 that has trifunctional methylenetetrahydrofolate dehydrogenase, methenyltetrahydrofolate cyclohydrolase, and formyltetrahydrofolate synthetase enzymatic activities, MTHFD1L only has  formyltetrahydrofolate synthetase activity.

Clinical significance 

Certain variants of the MTHFD1L are associated neural tube defects. Different alleles of SNP rs7646 in the 3′ UTR of MTHFD1L are differentially regulated by microRNAs affecting MTHFD1L expression.

Model organisms

Model organisms have been used in the study of MTHFD1L function. A conditional knockout mouse line, called Mthfd1ltm1a(EUCOMM)Wtsi was generated as part of the International Knockout Mouse Consortium program — a high-throughput mutagenesis project to generate and distribute animal models of disease to interested scientists.

Male and female animals underwent a standardized phenotypic screen to determine the effects of deletion. Twenty six tests were carried out on mutant mice and two significant abnormalities were observed. The homozygous mutant embryos identified during gestation had exencephaly. None survived until weaning. The remaining tests were carried out on heterozygous mutant adult mice and no further abnormalities were observed.

References

Further reading

EC 6.3.4
Genes mutated in mice